In mathematics, Pépin's test is a primality test, which can be used to determine whether a Fermat number is prime. It is a variant of Proth's test. The test is named for a French mathematician, Théophile Pépin.

Description of the test
Let  be the nth Fermat number. Pépin's test states that for n > 0,
 is prime if and only if 
The expression  can be evaluated modulo  by repeated squaring. This makes the test a fast polynomial-time algorithm. However, Fermat numbers grow so rapidly that only a handful of Fermat numbers can be tested in a reasonable amount of time and space.

Other bases may be used in place of 3. These bases are:

3, 5, 6, 7, 10, 12, 14, 20, 24, 27, 28, 39, 40, 41, 45, 48, 51, 54, 56, 63, 65, 75, 78, 80, 82, 85, 90, 91, 96, 102, 105, 108, 112, 119, 125, 126, 130, 147, 150, 156, 160, ... .

The primes in the above sequence are called Elite primes, they are:

3, 5, 7, 41, 15361, 23041, 26881, 61441, 87041, 163841, 544001, 604801, 6684673, 14172161, 159318017, 446960641, 1151139841, 3208642561, 38126223361, 108905103361, 171727482881, 318093312001, 443069456129, 912680550401, ... 

For integer b > 1, base b may be used if and only if only a finite number of Fermat numbers Fn satisfies that , where  is the Jacobi symbol.

In fact, Pépin's test is the same as the Euler-Jacobi test for Fermat numbers, since the Jacobi symbol  is −1, i.e. there are no Fermat numbers which are Euler-Jacobi pseudoprimes to these bases listed above.

Proof of correctness

Sufficiency: assume that the congruence

holds. Then , thus the multiplicative order of 3 modulo  divides , which is a power of two.

Necessity: assume that  is prime. By Euler's criterion,
,
where  is the Legendre symbol.
As , we conclude  from the law of quadratic reciprocity.

Historical Pépin tests 
Because of the sparsity of the Fermat numbers, the Pépin test has only been run eight times (on Fermat numbers whose primality statuses were not already known).

Notes

References
 P. Pépin, Sur la formule , Comptes rendus de l'Académie des Sciences de Paris 85 (1877), pp. 329–333.

External links 
The Prime Glossary: Pepin's test

Primality tests